KGWB (91.1 FM) is a radio station licensed to serve Snyder, Texas.  The station is owned by Western Texas College and licensed to the Scurry County Junior College District. It airs a college radio format.

The station was assigned the KGWB-FM call letters by the Federal Communications Commission on June 26, 2008.

This station is currently on the air. Broadcast students will eventually run the station as their classes progress. The basketball games for Western Texas College are broadcast on KGWB.

References

External links

GWB
Radio stations established in 2008
GWB